Jordan Nicola Bridget Raskopoulos (born 25 January 1982) is an Australian comedian, actress, streamer and singer best known for her role as a writer and performer on the Network Ten sketch comedy show The Ronnie Johns Half Hour, and as lead singer for comedy rock group The Axis of Awesome (2006–2018). Her father is former footballer Peter Raskopoulos, and her brother is Steen Raskopoulos, a fellow comedian.

Career
In 2003, Raskopoulos became involved with Impro Australia's Theatresports events including The Belvoir St Theatre Theatresports and the Cranston Cup competitions, winning State and National Titles. In 2005, she became part of the university sketch comedy supergroup The 3rd Degree who performed at the Melbourne International Comedy Festival. This group formed the base of the Network Ten's Logie award-winning cult ensemble sketch comedy television show The Ronnie Johns Half Hour, in which Raskopoulos starred and for which she wrote.

After the success of The Ronnie Johns Half Hour, Raskopoulos went on to appear in Stupid, Stupid Man, Stand Up Australia, Hole in the Wall, Good News Week and Thank God You're Here, and has provided voices for the ABC2 machinima series The Team. She was a team captain for a season of the SBS sports show The Squiz. In 2007, her debut solo stage show was called The Adventures of the Man with the Dominant Claw. With her band The Axis of Awesome, Raskopoulos has appeared on Q&A, Good News Week and The Footy Show.

From 2006 until 2018, Raskopoulos fronted the award-winning musical comedy trio The Axis of Awesome, whose parody song "4 Chords" has received over 80 million hits on YouTube and is one of the highest-rated comedy videos on the site. The group came to attention after the release of their songs parodying the 2007 Australian federal election and received a Moosehead award at the 2008 Melbourne International Comedy Festival for their show The Axis of Awesome Comeback Spectacular. Since 2009, the Axis of Awesome have produced four albums and toured extensively in the United States, UK, Europe, Asia and Australia, with sold-out seasons at the Edinburgh Festival Fringe. They broke up in 2018, after a temporary hiatus.

Prior to publicly coming out as a trans woman, Raskopoulos wrote articles on transgender issues for Junkee under the pseudonym Nicola Fierce.

Logies controversy

Raskopoulos was cast in the supporting role of Trax in the 2012 movie Underground: The Julian Assange Story along with Rachel Griffiths, Anthony LaPaglia and Alex Williams. In January 2013, Raskopoulos requested users of the internet forum Something Awful to vote for her in the most popular actor category of the 2013 Logie Awards, promising in return to allow site users to write her acceptance speech. This caused some controversy, with news outlets reporting that Raskopoulos, who despite a high-profile international comedy career was relatively unknown in Australian acting circles, planned to 'hack' the Logies. Raskopoulos herself described her campaign as no different to any ordinary "fan" campaign, stating: "I'm conspiring to rig the Logies in the same way Guy Sebastian's fan forums are, or [in the same way as] fans of The Voice are calling for votes for Joel Madden on Twitter." In support of her campaign to win votes, Raskopoulos appeared in a segment on Australian current affairs program Today Tonight dressed in a fur collar and acting in character, and stated that she wished to win a Logie for use as a doorstop.

Personal life
Raskopoulos is a transgender lesbian. Upon coming out publicly as transgender in 2016, she kept her given name but added the middle names Nicola and Bridget. She has attention deficit hyperactivity disorder and spoke about her anxiety disorder at a TEDx talk in 2017. Raskopoulos plays roller derby and has played Warhammer 40,000 since she was 12 years old.

Filmography

Film

Television

References

External links
Personal website
The Axis of Awesome

Jordan Raskopoulos on "The Ronnie Johns Good Times Campfire Jamboree Half Hour Show".

1982 births
Australian people of Greek descent
Australian stand-up comedians
Living people
Australian LGBT singers
Transgender comedians
Transgender women musicians
Lesbian comedians
Lesbian musicians
21st-century Australian singers
21st-century Australian women singers
Transgender singers
Australian LGBT comedians
People with attention deficit hyperactivity disorder